CBZF-FM is a Canadian radio station broadcasting at 99.5 MHz from Fredericton, New Brunswick and is the local Radio One station of the Canadian Broadcasting Corporation.

History
CBC Radio programming first aired in Fredericton on private affiliate CFNB.

CBC's own station launched on March 4, 1964 as CBZ at 970 AM. Provincial Premier Louis Robichaud and Don Messer's troupe were on hand for the opening ceremonies which originated from the Lord Beaverbrook Hotel.

In 2004, CBZ moved to the FM band on 99.5 MHz. The call sign was changed to CBZF-FM as CBZ-FM was already used by the Radio 2 sister station.

Local programming
CBZF currently produces a local morning news and current-affairs program, Information Morning, which airs weekdays from 6:00a.m. to 8:30 a.m. on CBZF. CBZF also produces news & weather updates which are heard throughout the province weekdays between 9a.m. and 6p.m. Information Morning is also simulcasted via CBAT-DT to the entire province. The program is called New Brunswick First and airs Monday to Friday from 6a.m. to 8a.m. on CBAT. CBAT is the only CBC-owned and operated affiliate that produces this kind of simulcast. CBZF also produces the provincial afternoon show Shift, which airs between 4p.m. and 6p.m. weekdays.

Current Staff
 Jeanne Armstrong - Host of Information Morning
 Myfanwy Davies - Producer of Information Morning
 Jennifer Sweet - Newsreader

Notable Former Staff
 Hance Colburne - host of Information Morning (Now at CBD-FM Saint John)
 Terry Seguin - host of Information Morning (Retired)

Transmitters 

In the 1970s, CBAM Edmunston changed its low-power AM frequency from 1490 kHz to 1320 kHz. CBAN-FM in Edmunston previously used the CBAM call sign until 2003, when it converted to FM at 99.5 MHz. That call sign now belongs to CBAM-FM in Moncton, which adopted it after CBA moved to FM in 2007.

On September 1, 2017, the CBC applied to convert CBAX from 600 kHz to 95.5 MHz. The new callsign will be CBZF-FM-1.
CBAX was the last low-power AM transmitter to rebroadcast CBZF-FM and also the last low-power CBC AM transmitter in the province. The CRTC approved the CBC's application to move CBAX to 95.5 FM on November 3, 2017.

References

External links
CBC New Brunswick
 

Bzf
Bzf
Radio stations established in 1964
1964 establishments in New Brunswick